World Sinfonia – La Melodia is a live album by guitar virtuoso Al Di Meola, released in 2008. It features his recent band with members Fausto Beccalossi (accordion), Peo Alfonsi (second acoustic guitar) and Gumbi Ortiz (cajon).

Track listing
"Infinite Desire" (Al Di Meola) - 9:31
"Cafe 1930" (Ástor Piazzolla) - 6:18
"Cinema Paradiso" (Ennio Morricone) - 3:05
"Misterio" (Al Di Meola) - 10:29
"Double Concerto" (Ástor Piazzolla) - 8:50
"Turquoise" (Al Di Meola) - 8:50
"Umbras" (Andrea Parodi) - 10:40
"Mediterranean Sundance" (Al Di Meola) - 4:45
"No Potho Reposare" (traditional) - 5:00

Al Di Meola albums
2008 live albums